A skinny dip is a colloquial term for nude swimming.

Skinny dip may also refer to:

 Skinny Dip (novel), by Carl Hiaasen, 2004
 Skinny Dip, a beer made by New Belgium Brewing Company
 Skinny DIP, a narrow dual in-line package in the field of electronics

Other uses
 The Skinny Dip, a Canadian adventure television series

See also
 Skinny Dipping (disambiguation)
 Skinny (disambiguation)
 The Skinny (disambiguation)